Ortolani may refer to:

People 
Angiolina Ortolani-Tiberini (1834–1913), born Angiolina Ortolani, 19th-century Italian operatic soprano
Franco Ortolani (1943–2019), Italian academic and politician
Leonardo Ortolani (born 1967), Italian comics author
Marino Ortolani (1904–1983), Italian physician
Riz Ortolani (1926–2014), Italian film composer
Umberto Ortolani (1913–2002) Italian businessman

Other 
Dino Ortolani, a character in the TV series Oz
Ortolani test, a physical examination for developmental dysplasia of the hip

See also
Ortolan (disambiguation)
Orto (disambiguation)